Syntrophobacter pfennigii is a species of syntrophic propionate-oxidising anaerobic bacterium. Strain KoProp1 is the type strain.

References

Further reading
Whitman, William B., et al., eds. Bergey's manual® of systematic bacteriology. Vol. 2. Springer, 2012.

External links
J.P. Euzéby: List of Prokaryotic names with Standing in Nomenclature

Type strain of Syntrophobacter pfennigii at BacDive -  the Bacterial Diversity Metadatabase

Thermodesulfobacteriota
Bacteria described in 1996